Talkhab-e Olya may refer to:
 Talkhab-e Olya, Fars
 Talkhab-e Olya, Kohgiluyeh and Boyer-Ahmad